James William Chichetto is a poet, artist, Professor of Communications, and a Catholic priest of the Congregation of Holy Cross, an international religious community that founded and sponsors the University of Notre Dame, Stonehill College, the University of Portland, and King's College, among others.

Biography
He was born in 1941 in Boston, Massachusetts, and grew up in The Berkshires. He graduated from Stonehill College and studied theology at Holy Cross College in Washington, D.C., whose faculty later became part of the Theology Department at the University of Notre Dame. He did further graduate studies at Catholic University, Chicago University (South Asian Languages and Civilization), and Wesleyan University. Following his ordination, he worked in Peru, South America, for three years before getting ill, which experience he recounts in a novel, Lazaro. He is the author of several books of poems, most notably a 12-thousand-line epic poem entitled, "The Dream of Norumbega: An Epic Poem on the United States of America." It includes the deeds of several American historical characters, including Captain John Smith, General Winfield Scott, and George Washington. To date, four volumes of the work (to be issued incrementally) have been published. The poet and critic Robert Peters, who has reviewed Chichetto's earlier works, called "The Dream" a contemporary masterpiece. "He has taken the 'voice portrait genre' [created by Peters] to new directions," notes Peters. Chichetto is a recipient of numerous grants and is currently a professor of Communications at Stonehill College.

Selected works
Poems, Commonwealth Press (1972)
Stones, a Litany (1980) 
Dialogue: Emily Dickinson and Christopher Cauldwell, Commonwealth Press (1982)
Gilgamesh and Other Poems (1983) 
Victims (1987) 
Homage to Father Edward Sorin (1992, 98) 
Reckoning Genocide (2002) 
Foreword to Perversions of Justice (2002) 
Four Chinese American and Chinese Poets, ed. w/ Emily Yau (2014) 
Preface  to All For Her (2018)  
The Dream of Norumbega, an Epic Poem on The United States of America Volumes I, II, III, IV (2000,'05,'08,'20) 
 Blood Accounts (2020)  
 George Washington's Wars With His Slave, Ona Judge (2021)

Other selected publications
The Boston Phoenix; The Manhattan Review; The Other Side; International Voices Review; The Colorado Review; America Magazine; Poem Magazine; Harper's Magazine; The Tablet (London); The Connecticut Poetry Review; Mr. Cogito; The Boston Globe; Christian Century; Combat Literary Magazine; The Vision: Native American Poetry Anthology; Blood to Remember: American Poets on the Holocaust;  Commonweal; Gargoyle Magazine (Cambridge); American Poets of the 1990s; And What Rough Beast: Poems at the End of the Century; The National Catholic Reporter; East West Literary Journal; Anthology of Magazine Verse Yearbook of American Poetry (1986–88), etc.

Critical reception and style
Dan Carr, poet and editor (Golgonooza Letter and Foundry Press) and one of his first publishers (Stones, A Litany), notes how Chichetto's poems are "well crafted and strong," especially in regard to their "lyrical power" and "elegiac sympathy" for the exploited and defeated. He also notes that his longest poem, "Stones, A Litany," about the great stones of Cuzco, Peru, has "been performed successfully with music."

Edwin Honig, poet, playwright, and professor emeritus (Brown University), says this about his earlier work, Victims: "This is an impressive selection of work by a vigorous young talent....Evocations of Sitting Bull and Herman Melville spin from Chichetto's mind -- a stark energy fuses with his special tenderness. Chichetto's forms are varied and skilled...I will watch for more of his work."

George Klawitter, poet, critic, and professor  (St. Edward's University), says this about his Homage to Father Edward Sorin, C.S.C.: "Chichetto is at his best when he sticks to narrative. For example, the opening poem [of the book] gives us a clear glimpse of the Sorin entourage riding north to Notre Dame from southern Indiana, November 16, 1842, the first day of the trip:

Underbrush scrapes their rusty coach.
The wheels keep turning, scabbed with ice.
The ox-drawn cart seems overloaded
On a road un-helped by light.

The words have been carefully chosen to create a precise picture of the vehicle at odds with the elements. 'Scabbed with ice' is a fresh way of seeing the build-up of ice on wheels; it carries a medicinal flavor of disease, making the road more enemy than not. 'Un-helped by light' is a particularly felicitous combination in that it paints by negative what 'dark' could not do: we can see the cart lumbering along over a winter road even though we are told the light is of little use to the missionaries or to us. It is the eye for detail that makes Chichetto resonate, even when we are at a loss for meaning. For example, the poem 'Father Sorin's Journal: Cholera Plague, 1849' begins 'Brother rests in the shade, almost unstirring, nibbling on an apple./ Trees shift in the sunlight's shadowy veil.' The picture is delicate and fine, the detail of the apple a wonderful touch, all in a poem supposedly about cholera but which never mentions the disease (beyond the title of the poem) or even hints at it. The Brother under the tree watches birds, shoos a dog, lies down. The reader wonders at the match of title to poem, the riddle worth hours of discussion."  

Of all the observers of Chichetto's earlier poetry, possibly Robert Peters, poet, critic, and professor emeritus (UCLA, Irvine), has been the most insightful, supportive, and nuanced in appraising it. For example, he praises him for "staging himself through Gilgamesh in Gilgamesh and Other Poems, notes the "beauty of the poems" in general, and singles out lines from his "favorite poem" ("Sugar Cane Fields in Peru").

In Homage to Father Edward Sorin, Peters quotes lines from one of the longer poems of the work, "Fr. Sorin and the Great Fire at Notre Dame, 1879" ("possibly the best"), noting the book as a whole "is an important contribution to the 'voice portrait' genre":

He spits into some ashes,
    turns cinder over
with his foot. He pushes 
    some strands of hair
from his forehead, then
    brushes his shoulder.
He reaches into the debris
    for an old door knob,
then motionless stands over
               the door
in black silence.

Later he walks toward the lakes.
He looks out over the plowlines 
and across the great silence of water.
"The sky of Indiana still stirs in the lakes," he thinks.
"I can still labor."
That night, throwing his cassock on a chair,
he strips to his waist to wash.

Currently four volumes of Chichetto's epic poem, The Dream of Norumbega, are out in paperback. Book IV was reissued under a different publisher and title, George Washington's Wars With His Slave, Ona Judge.

References

Selected external links

 Harris Collection, Brown University/CT. POETRY REVIEW Archives/art 
 Contemporary Authors Series, Volume 191  
 Contemporary Authors, New Revised Series, Volume 165.  
 Robert Peters Papers/ UC, San Diego 
 Poets and Writers Directory 
 Poets House 
 Directory of American Scholars, Volume 2, 
 International Who's Who of Authors and Writers, 2008, Routledge 

1941 births
American male poets
Congregation of Holy Cross
Living people
Catholic University of America alumni
University of Chicago alumni
Wesleyan University alumni
20th-century American poets
21st-century American poets